Jaideep Singh (born 21 August 1987) is an Indian heavyweight kickboxer and mixed martial artist. He is the K-1 World Grand Prix 2009 in Seoul tournament champion.

Kickboxing career
Jaideep faced Ismael Londt at the K-1 World Grand Prix 2012 in Tokyo Final 16 on 14 October 2012 and lost via majority decision.

He was scheduled to fight Yong Soo Park at Glory 5: London on 23 March 2013 in London, England but Park was replaced by Daniel Sam. He lost by unanimous decision.

Jaideep was set to fight Anderson "Braddock" Silva at Glory 8: Tokyo - 2013 65kg Slam on 3 May 2013. The fight was cancelled.

He lost to Fatih Ulosoy via third round TKO at Global FC 3 in Dubai, UAE on 29 May 2014.

Mixed martial arts career
Jaideep was scheduled to make his professional MMA debut for the Indian-based promotion Super Fight League at SFL10 against Mohamed Abdel Karim, but had to pull out of the fight due to injury and was replaced by Jimmy Ambriz.

At SFL 16, it was announced during the event that Jaideep signed a contract with the SFL and would be making his debut in the near future.

He debuted at SFL 19 on 7 June 2013 and TKO'd Alireza Tavak with elbows in round one.

He faced Fedor Emelianenko on 31 December 2015 in Japan under Rizin Fighting Federation banner. Singh lost the fight via TKO in the first round.

Championships and accomplishments

Kickboxing
J-NETWORK
J-NETWORK Heavyweight Championship (2008-present: 2 defense)
K-1
2009 K-1 World Grand Prix in Seoul Champion
RISE
2011 RISE Heavyweight Tournament Champion

Mixed martial arts
DEEP
DEEP Megatonweight Champion (1 Time, First)

Kickboxing record

|-  style="background:#fbb;"
| 2014-05-29 || Loss ||align=left| Fatih Ulusoy || Global FC 3 || Dubai, UAE || TKO (Punches) || 3 || 1:42
|-  style="background:#fbb;"
| 2013-03-23 || Loss ||align=left| Daniel Sam || Glory 5: London || London, England || Decision (Unanimous) || 3 || 3:00 
|-  style="background:#fbb;"
| 2012-10-14 || Loss ||align=left| Ismael Londt || K-1 World Grand Prix 2012 in Tokyo Final 16, First Round || Tokyo, Japan || Decision (Majority) || 3 || 3:00
|-  style="background:#cfc;"
| 2011-11-23 || Win ||align=left| Makoto Uehara || RISE 85: RISE Heavyweight Tournament 2011, Final || Tokyo, Japan || KO || 1 || 0:38
|-   
! style=background:white colspan=9 |   
|-  style="background:#cfc;"
| 2011-11-23 || Win ||align=left| Raoumaru || RISE 85: RISE Heavyweight Tournament 2011, Semi Finals || Tokyo, Japan || KO (Knees) || 1 || 1:39
|-  style="background:#cfc;"
| 2011-11-23 || Win ||align=left| Hiromi Amada || RISE 85: RISE Heavyweight Tournament 2011, Quarter Finals || Tokyo, Japan || TKO (Doctor Stoppage) || 1 || 2:59
|-  style="background:#cfc;"
| 2011-09-23 || Win ||align=left| Tsutomu Takahagi || RISE 83 || Tokyo, Japan || KO (Flying knee) || 1 || N/A 
|-  style="background:#fbb;"
| 2011-07-02 || Loss ||align=left| Xhavit Bajrami || K-1 MAX Switzerland 2011 || Luzern, Switzerland || Decision (Unanimous) || 5 || 3:00
|-
! style=background:white colspan=9 |
|-  style="background:#cfc;"
| 2010-12-11 || Win ||align=left| Sergei Kharitonov || K-1 World Grand Prix 2010 Final || Tokyo, Japan || KO (Right hook) || 1 || 2:58
|-  style="background:#cfc;"
| 2010-08-22 || Win ||align=left| Prince Ali ||  J-Network "Force for the Truth of J 4th"  || Japan || KO (Knees) || 2 || 1:08
|-
! style=background:white colspan=9 |
|-  style="background:#fbb;"
| 2010-04-03 || Loss ||align=left| Gokhan Saki || K-1 World Grand Prix 2010 in Yokohama || Yokohama, Japan || Decision (Unanimous) || 3 || 3:00
|-  style="background:#cfc;"
| 2009-12-05 || Win ||align=left| Makoto Uehara || K-1 World Grand Prix 2009 Final || Yokohama, Japan || KO (Right hook) || 2 || 1:36
|-  style="background:#fbb;"
| 2009-09-26 || Loss ||align=left| Ewerton Teixeira || K-1 World Grand Prix 2009 Final 16 || Seoul, Republic of Korea ||2 Ext R. Decision (Unanimous) || 5 || 3:00
|-  style="background:#cfc;"
| 2009-08-02 || Win ||align=left| Taiei Kin || K-1 World Grand Prix 2009 in Seoul || Seoul, Republic of Korea || Decision (Unanimous) || 3 || 3:00
|-
! style=background:white colspan=9 |
|-  style="background:#cfc;"
| 2009-08-02 || Win ||align=left| Min Ho Song || K-1 World Grand Prix 2009 in Seoul || Seoul, Republic of Korea || KO (Right low kick) || 1 || 2:45
|-  style="background:#cfc;"
| 2009-08-02 || Win ||align=left| Yong Soo Park || K-1 World Grand Prix 2009 in Seoul || Seoul, Republic of Korea || KO (Right hook) || 2 || 1:35
|-  style="background:#cfc;"
| 2009-05-06 || Win ||align=left| Koichi Watanabe || J-Network "Get Real in J-World 2nd" || Japan || Decision (Unanimous) || 5 || 3:00
|-
! style=background:white colspan=9 |
|-  style="background:#fbb;"
| 2008-11-30 || Loss ||align=left| Fabiano Aoki || Rise 51 || Japan || Ext R. Decision (Unanimous) || 4 || 3:00
|-  style="background:#cfc;"
| 2008-09-15 || Win ||align=left| Yong || Titans Neos IV || Japan || TKO (Doctor Stoppage) || 3 || 0:22
|-  style="background:#cfc;"
| 2008-04-11 || Win ||align=left| Fabiano Aoki || J-Network  "Let's Kick with J the 2nd" || Japan || Decision (Unanimous) || 5 || 3:00
|-
! style=background:white colspan=9 |
|-  style="background:#cfc;"
| 2008-02-29 || Win ||align=left| Prince Ali || J-Network  "Let's Kick with J the 1st" || Japan || KO (Right knee) || 2 || 2:05
|-  style="background:#cfc;"
| 2008-02-29 || Win ||align=left| Tsutomu Takahagi || J-Network  "Let's Kick with J the 1st" || Japan || KO (Right hook) || 1 || 1:17
|-  style="background:#fbb;"
| 2007-12-16 || Loss ||align=left| Fabiano Aoki || Rise Dead or Alive tournament 07 || Japan || KO (Right hook) || 1 || 2:45
|-  style="background:#cfc;"
| 2007-08-26 || Win ||align=left| Moriguti Riyu || Rise "The Face" || Japan || Decision (Unanimous) || 3 || 3:00
|-  style="background:#cfc;"
| 2007-06-10 || Win ||align=left| Hui Yu || All Japan Kickboxing Federation "Kicks 7" || Japan || Decision (Unanimous) || 3 || 3:00
|-  style="background:#cfc;"
| 2006-12-08 || Win ||align=left| Katsunori Tanigawa || All Japan Kickboxing Federation "Fujiwara Festival 2006" || Japan || KO || 1 || 1:48
|-
| colspan=9 | Legend:

Grappling record

|-  style="background:#fbb;"
| 2010-02-06 || Loss ||align=left| Hideki Sekine || DEEP X 05 || Tokyo, Japan || Points (1–27) || 2 || 4:00
|-
| colspan=9 | Legend:

Mixed martial arts record

|-
|Loss
|align=center|2–3
|Roque Martinez
|Decision (unanimous)
|Deep Cage Impact 2017: At Korakuen Hall
|
|align=center|3
|align=center|5:00
|Korakuen Hall, Japan
|Lost DEEP Megatonweight Championship.
|-
|Loss
|align=center|2–2
|Teodoras Aukstuolis
|Decision (unanimous)
|Rizin 1
|
|align=center|3
|align=center|5:00
|Nagoya, Japan
|
|-
|Loss
|align=center|2–1
|Fedor Emelianenko
|TKO (submission to punches)
|Rizin World Grand Prix 2015: Part 1 - Saraba
|
|align=center|1
|align=center|3:02
|Saitama, Japan
|
|-
|Win
|align=center|2–0
| Carlos Toyota
|TKO (corner stoppage)
|Deep - 73 Impact
|
|align=center|2
|align=center|5:00
|Tokyo, Japan
|Won DEEP Megatonweight Championship.
|-
|Win
|align=center|1–0
| Alireza Tavak
|TKO (elbows)
|SFL 19
|
|align=center|1
|align=center|4:24
| Mumbai, India
|

See also 
List of K-1 events
List of K-1 champions
List of male kickboxers

References

External links 
Singh "HEART" Jaideep Official Website

1987 births
Living people
Indian male kickboxers
Heavyweight kickboxers
Indian male mixed martial artists
Indian expatriates in Japan
Heavyweight mixed martial artists
Mixed martial artists utilizing kickboxing
Deep (mixed martial arts) champions